Amor Fati is the second full-length release from the avant-garde metal band Peccatum.

Track listing 
"One Play. No Script."
"No Title for a Cause"
"Murder"
"A Game Divine?"
"untitled"
"Rise, Ye Humans"
"Between The Living and the Dead"
"untitled"
"The Watchers Mass (Part I)"
"The Watchers Mass (Part II)"

References 

2000 albums
Mnemosyne Productions albums
Peccatum albums